Chris Stevens or Chris Stephens may refer to:
 Chris Stevens (rower) (born 1946), Australian Olympic rower
 Chris Stephens (cricketer) (born 1948), South African cricketer
 Chris Stevens (mathematician) (fl. 1970s–2010s), American mathematician
 Christine Stephens (fl. 1990s–2010s), New Zealand psychology academic
 Christopher Stevens (musician) (born 1967), American record producer and songwriter
 Chris Stephens (born 1973), Scottish National Party Member of Parliament for Glasgow South West
 Chris Stevens (Northern Exposure), a character in Northern Exposure
 Chris Stephens (rugby union), Welsh rugby union player

See also
 Christopher Stevens (disambiguation)
 Christine Stephen (disambiguation)